Newbury Dam is a dam in South Africa.

See also
List of reservoirs and dams in South Africa

References 
 List of South African Dams from the Department of Water Affairs and Forestry (South Africa)

Dams in South Africa